Steven Ray Mooshagian (born March 27, 1959) is an American football coach and former player. He is the head football coach at Ventura College in Ventura, California, a position he has held since 2010. Mooshagian served as the head football coach at Sacramento State from 2003 to 2006, compiling a record of 11–33. He was an assistant coach with the Cincinnati Bengals of the National Football League (NFL) from 1999 to 2002, Prior to that, he was the offensive coordinator at Nevada in 1996 and Pittsburgh from 1997 to 1998.

Head coaching record

College

References

External links
 Ventura College profile
 Pro Football Archives profile

1959 births
Living people
Cerritos Falcons football players
Cincinnati Bengals coaches
Fresno State Bulldogs football coaches
Fresno State Bulldogs football players
Nevada Wolf Pack football coaches
Pittsburgh Panthers football coaches
Sacramento State Hornets football coaches
San Diego Toreros football coaches
High school football coaches in California
Junior college football coaches in the United States
Sportspeople from Downey, California
Players of American football from California